is a Japanese footballer who plays for Zweigen Kanazawa.

Career
After five seasons in Tottori and a solid 2019, Hayashi signed with newly-promoted FC Imabari in January 2020.

Club statistics
Updated to 23 February 2020.

References

External links

Profile at Gainare Tottori

1996 births
Living people
Association football people from Hyōgo Prefecture
Japanese footballers
J3 League players
Gainare Tottori players
FC Imabari players
Association football midfielders

Montedio Yamagata players
Zweigen Kanazawa players